Abranovce is a village and municipality in Prešov District in the Prešov Region of eastern Slovakia.

Population 
It has a population of about 698 people (2020-12-31).

Genealogical resources
The records for genealogical research are available at the state archive "Statny Archiv in Presov, Slovakia"

 Roman Catholic church records (births/marriages/deaths): 1814-1895
 Greek Catholic church records (births/marriages/deaths): 1762-1895
 Lutheran church records (births/marriages/deaths): 1768-1898
 Census records 1869 of Abranovce are available at the state archive.

See also
 List of municipalities and towns in Slovakia

References

External links

 
Surnames of living people in Abranovce

Villages and municipalities in Prešov District
Šariš